Condexenus is a genus of bristle millipede containing the sole species Condexenus biramipalpus known from Namibia. Individuals are up to 3 mm long, and adults possess 11 body segments and 15 pairs of legs.

References

Polyxenida
Millipedes of Africa
Animals described in 2006
Arthropods of Namibia
Monotypic arthropod genera